Qanat-e Now (also Romanized as Qanāt-e Now and Qanāt Now; also known as Ghanat Now) is a village in Esfandaqeh Rural District, in the Central District of Jiroft County, Kerman Province, Iran. At the 2006 census, its population was 86, in 16 families.

References 

Populated places in Jiroft County